Vincenzo Renato Luigi Reyes Villafuerte (born November 7, 1996) is a Filipino politician who has served as Governor of Camarines Sur since June 30, 2022.

Political career
Villafuerte defeated incumbent vice governor Imelda Papin, former Representative Rolando Andaya Jr., and two independents in the 2022 Camarines Sur gubernatorial election. His win helped end the run of the Andaya and Alfelor families in Camarines Sur politics, perpetuating the Villafuerte clan.

Personal life
Villafuerte is the son of Luis Raymund Villafuerte, and brother to Miguel Luis Villafuerte. He is the grandson of Luis Villafuerte and Nelly Favis-Villafuerte.

References

Living people
Governors of Camarines Sur
Bicolano politicians
Bicolano people
People from Camarines Sur
1996 births